The 1938 Italian Athletics Championships was the 27th edition of the Italian Athletics Championships and were held in Bologna (main event) from 23 to 24 July.

Champions

Full results.

References

External links
 Italian Athletics Federation

Italian Athletics Championships
Athletics
Italian Athletics Outdoor Championships
Athletics competitions in Italy